Anne Isaacs (born March 2, 1949) is an American writer of children's and young adult literature. She is known as the writer of Swamp Angel, a picture book illustrated by Paul O. Zelinsky and published by Dutton Children's Books in 1994. Zelinsky was a runner-up for the annual Caldecott Medal for this work.
In 2014, Swamp Angel was a runner-up (Honor Book) for the Phoenix Picture Book Award from the Children's Literature Association, which annually recognizes the best picture book that did not win a major award 20 years earlier. "Books are considered not only for the quality of their illustrations, but for the way pictures and text work together."

Biography

Early life 

Isaacs was born in 1949, in Buffalo, New York, and lived there until she left for college in 1967. She attended the University of Michigan, where she received two bachelor's degrees, English Literature and Environmental Education, and her Master's of Science degree in 1975. Since 1975, Isaacs has lived in various cities in Canada and California. Isaacs married Samuel Koplowicz, a media producer, in 1978. She and her husband and three kids now live in Berkley, California, on the San Francisco Bay. Isaacs held a series of positions in the field of environmental education until the mid-1980s and took on writing fiction as a second profession.

Inspiration 

"All my life", says Isaacs, "poetry has affected me more than any other genre. I have read and memorized it, studied it, loved, and written it since I was nine." As a child she has called herself "shy and usually lost in a world of my imagination. I read constantly from fourth grade on, plucking books haphazardly from my parents' or the library's shelves: Romeo and Juliet, Lorna Doone, Wind in the Willows, The Caine Mutiny. In fourth grade I was changed forever by my first readings of Shakespeare and Coleridge. I was spellbound by their emotional directness, interweaving of thought and feeling, and above, all, the pure music of their words. I read Little Women more times than any other book. Like the heroine, Jo, I grew up to combine careers as an educator, mother, and children's book writer."

First writings 

Isaacs dabbled in writing as a child, but it wasn't until she had children of her own that she began to write seriously, and to think about trying to get a book published. She has said "I seem fated to come to books in reverse order. I mainly read adult literature as a child, but as an adult I began to read children's literature, often encountering a classic work for the first time while reading it to my children."

Major works

Swamp Angel 

Isaacs teamed up with Illustrator Paul O. Zelinsky, narrates the story of Angelica Longrider, a native Tennessee Hill and her rise as the greatest woodswoman in the land. The idea of "Swamp Angel" was to have a girl in a tall tale doing extraordinary and strong actions.

Angelic Longrider or "Swamp Angel" becomes the greatest woodsman in Tennessee in an original American tall tale, one much like those of Paul Bunyan and Pecos Bill. Taller than her mother at birth, Swamp Angel builds her first log cabin at the age of two. After many great feats, she takes on Thundering Tarnation, a black bear "with bottomless appetite for settlers' grub". Eventually she sends Tarnation up to the sky, where he becomes a constellation.

The book won the prestigious place of the 1995 Caldecott Honor book, along with the 1995 Boston Globe–Horn Book Award Honor Book, 1994 ALA Notable Book, The New York Times Best Illustrated Books of 1994, School Library Journal Best Books of 1994, ALA Booklist Children's Editors Choices 1994, Publishers Weekly Best Books of 1994, TIME'''s 8 Best Children's Books 1994, Parenting Magazine Reading-Magic Award, 10 Best Books of 1994, and the 1995 Notable Trade Book in Language Arts."Swamp Angel" (top page). AnneIsaacs.com. Retrieved 2014-07-16.

 Treehouse Tales 

A strange treehouse is the setting for the adventures of three 1880s Pennsylvania farm children who experience it, in turn, as a refuge, a lookout post, and a frightening dragon's lair. In three interlocking stories, Tom, Emily, and Nathaniel each confront the mischief that ensues when their dreams come all too true. The stories are fairytale-like and romantic in their reading. Treehouse Tales started out its life as Outhouse Tales, a group of stories that all had something to do with an outhouse. The stories were semi-autobiographical, taken from humorous experiences at a girl scout camp where Isaacs was a counselor. She decided to change the name and focal point to make it more child appropriate.

 Cat Up a Tree 

A book of poetry by Isaacs focuses on what she considers a completely ordinary situation: a cat stuck in a tree. The story unfolds one poem at a time, presenting different characters, all of whom think they know best what to do with the cat. The fireman and cat-catcher, a little girl, a wary robin,  an overzealous mayor, and more all have their point of view on what to do with the cat and whether it even needs catching.

 Torn Thread 

Based on the true story of her mother-in-law, Isaacs writes a story about Eva. In 1943, in Poland, the life of 12-year-old Eva turns when her sick sister is seized by the Nazis in a raid on the Jewish ghetto. In an effort to save both of his daughters, their father sends Eva to join her sister in a Nazi labor camp, where the girls are used as child labor to spin thread on machinery to make blankets for the German army. As she struggles amid ever-worsening conditions to save her life and that of her sick sister, Eva overcomes many struggles, including the lack of clothing and food. These two teenagers strive to create home and family for each other amidst the inhumanity and chaos that made up Nazi Germany.

The book has been awarded with the Outstanding International Book, Notable Book for a Global Society 2000, American Library Association: Notable Book, Best Books for Young Adults, 2000, National Jewish Book Award Finalist, Booklist: Best of the Year—Holocaust Literature for Youth, 2000, New York Public Library's 100 Titles for Reading and Sharing, 2000, Sydney Taylor Honor Book, Notable Book for Young Readers Pick of the Lists, American Booksellers Association, Smithsonian Notable Book for Children, and the Children's Literature Choice Book.

 Pancakes for Supper Pancakes for Supper features little blonde-haired Toby. When her family's wagon hits a bump, Toby Littlewood is hurled into the sky and lands in a forest. There, she meets a porcupine, a bear, and a hungry cougar, among other fearsome creatures. Cleverly, she talks each one out of eating her by offering up her fancy clothes. In the end, in a competition to be the grandest beast, the vain animals chase each other around and around a maple tree, where they turn into maple syrup that she eats on her pancakes for supper. The story is a folksy storytelling offering a twist to The Story of Little Black Sambo.

 The Ghosts of Luckless Gulch The Ghosts of Luckless Gulch (Atheneum Books, 2008) takes place at the cusp of the California Gold Rush in 1848. Estrella, a Latina, can run so fast she burns up the air, and can leave a trail of flames wherever she runs on her father's rancho north of San Francisco. Her pets—a Kickle Snifter, a Sidehill Wowser, and a Rubberado puppy—are based on 19th-century tall tales and Pourquoi stories, or origin myths. Estrella has the power to heal them, along with wild animals she encounters. When the Ghosts of Luckless Gulch steal her pets, and come up with a sure-fire plan to steal all the gold in California, Estrella finds the need to use her powers to save the day.

Isaacs was living in Petaluma, California, while she wrote this book, near Rancho Petaluma Adobe, the former home of General Mariano Vallejo, now the last remaining "rancho" house and a state historic park. The Petaluma Adobe provided her with a model home for Estrella. The Vallejo family became the model for Estrella's family. The State Historic Parks District Interpretation library and the UC Berkeley's Bancroft Library provided many historic details regarding Northern California landscape and life during the early years of the Gold Rush. The towns, supplies, prices, and most of the settings were all historically researched by Isaacs.

 Dust Devil 

Isaacs and Zelinsky completed a sequel to Swamp Angel more than 15 years later, Dust Devil'', published by Schwartz & Wade in 2010. Swamp Angel has a reputation as the greatest woodswoman in all of Tennessee. But when she grows too big for that state, she moves to Montana. It's there that she wrestles a raging storm to the ground and, at its center, finds herself a sidekick—a horse she names Dust Devil. And when Backward Bart, an outlaw, starts terrorizing the prairie, Angel and Dust Devil are the only ones strong enough to stop him.

References

External links
 

 

1949 births
American children's writers
University of Michigan College of Literature, Science, and the Arts alumni
Living people